Jeremiah Mason was an English footballer who played in the Football League for Wolverhampton Wanderers.

References

Year of birth unknown
Date of death unknown
English footballers
Wolverhampton Wanderers F.C. players
English Football League players
Association football defenders